Granita was a restaurant at number 127 Upper Street in Islington. It was founded in the early 1990s by Vicky Leffman. Its decor was bright and light with a Scandinavian style of pale wood. Its cuisine was modern British, fusing classic dishes such as mussels with exotic ingredients such as lemongrass.

It was the setting for the Blair-Brown deal between the then shadow Home Secretary Tony Blair and the then shadow Chancellor of the Exchequer, Gordon Brown, in 1994.

The restaurant was sold to Hüseyin Özer's Sofra group in 2002 but then closed in 2003, being replaced by a Tex-Mex restaurant called Desperados.  When Desperados moved to number 67 in 2013, the premises was then converted to become an estate agent.

References

Buildings and structures in Islington
Defunct European restaurants
Defunct restaurants in London
European restaurants in London
Former buildings and structures in the London Borough of Islington
Fusion cuisine
Restaurants disestablished in 2003